Kampong Siam is an ethnic Siamese enclave (where the population are mostly a minority consisting of Thai expats and recent migrants as well as local-born Siamese descendants with ancestral roots from neighbouring areas such as Perlis, Kedah, Hulu Perak district of Perak as well as Kelantan) within the city of George Town in Penang, Malaysia. The  neighbourhood is situated near the corner between Burmah Road and Burmah Lane, immediately adjacent to Wat Chaiyamangkalaram.

The neighbourhood is still inhabited by ethnic Siamese, who had moved into the area as early as the 19th century. However, the enclave has also, in recent years, been under threat from rapid urbanisation and redevelopment.

History 
The first Siamese settlers were believed to have arrived at Pulau Tikus in the early 19th century. According to a census conducted in 1828, as many as 1,117 ethnic Siamese were residing within Kampung Siam. In 1845, the land where Kampung Siam now stands was granted by the British authorities to the ethnic Siamese as a gesture of goodwill to Siam. The four female Siamese trustees who became custodians of the land also built Wat Chaiyamangkalaram next to the village.

More recently, Kampung Siam's residents have been embroiled in a tussle over land rights, as the neighbourhood is earmarked for the construction of a hotel. Although the land was held in trust, it was sold without the trust holders' knowledge to a developer in 2014. When the residents were issued eviction notices, a lawsuit was filed in retaliation against the developer. The lawsuit was dismissed in 2015, leading to fears that the Siamese enclave will be bulldozed to make way for redevelopment.

See also 

 Wat Chayamangkalaram
 Wat Buppharam, Penang
 Malaysian Siamese
 Pulau Tikus
 Kampong Serani
 Ayer Rajah

References 

Populated places in Penang
Ethnic enclaves in Malaysia
Thai diaspora in Malaysia
Thai Towns